Asthenomacrurus is a genus of rattails of the family Macrouridae.

Species
The currently recognized species in this genus are:
 Asthenomacrurus fragilis (Garman, 1899) (fragile grenadier)
 Asthenomacrurus victoris Sazonov & Shcherbachev, 1982 (victory whiptail)

References

Macrouridae